FC Veino is a Belarusian football club based in the town of Veino, Mogilev Raion.

History
The team was founded at some point in early 90s as FC Veino, and initially played at amateur level in Mogilev Oblast championship. The club turned professional and joined Belarusian Second League in 1995. After two seasons spent in the Second League the team got promoted to the First League in 1997.

In 1999 the club partnered with Premier League club Dnepr-Transmash Mogilev and became its farm club; the team's name was changed to FC Veino-Dnepr. In 2000 the club finished in relegation zone, and since 2001 they play at amateur level in Mogilev Oblast league again as FC Veino. They have won the league in 2010 and 2014.

External links
 Club profile at footballfacts.ru

Football clubs in Belarus
1995 establishments in Belarus
2001 disestablishments in Belarus
Association football clubs established in 1995
Association football clubs disestablished in 2001